Oleg Vladimirovich Lebedev (Russian: Олег Владимирович Лебедев; born on 21 March 1964), is a Kazakh-born Russian politician who had been a member of parliament of the State Duma of the 5th and 6th convocations.

Biography

Oleg Lebedev was born on 21 March 1964 in Rudny, Kazakhstan, and raised in Partenit, Crimea. In 1981, he received his secondary education at the Frunze village school of Alushta, after which he entered the Kharkiv Higher Military Aviation School of Radio Electronics named after the Lenin Komsomol of Ukraine, which he graduated in 1985. In 1986 he took part in the Soviet–Afghan War. There, while moving on the route from Kabul to Ghazni, the convoy, which was accompanied by Lebedev, came under fire. Two vehicles were hit. Having destroyed the machine-gun crew, it was possible to withdraw the convoy from the shelling. For these actions, Lebedev was subsequently awarded a combat award of the Order of the Red Star.

In 1996, he founded The Generation charitable foundation, whose activities were aimed at the development of education, sports and health care. The Foundation collaborated with the Moscow Scientific Center for Cardiovascular Surgery named after V.I. Bakulev, and raised funds for complex heart surgeries for children. In addition, the foundation has established a literary prize for young authors - "Debut". He was the general director of the fund until 2007, until he went into politics, after which he headed the board of trustees for a long time.

Lebedev was elected to the State Duma in 2007 and 2011. He was the first deputy of the Duma Committee on CIS affairs, Eurasian integration and relations with compatriots. As a member of the State Duma, he has authored 73 bills, some of which became federal laws, including changes concerning the regulation of the wine industry.

In 2012, he graduated from the All-Russian Academy of Foreign Trade. He has now returned to Crimea and lives in his father's house. He is a leading researcher at the Institute of Economics and Management at the Crimean Federal University.

References

1964 births
Living people
United Russia politicians
Fifth convocation members of the State Duma (Russian Federation)
Sixth convocation members of the State Duma (Russian Federation)